

List of Ambassadors

Zehavit Ben-Hillel 2020 - 
Eddie Shapira 2017 - 2020
Carmela Shamir 2013 - 2017
Hillel Newman 2008 - 2013
Emanuel Mehl 2004-2008
Zvi Cohen-Litant 2002 - 2004
Noah Gal Gendler 1997-2002
Israel Mey-Ami 1992 - 1994

References

Uzbekistan
Israel